The 1977 United States Grand Prix was a Formula One motor race held on October 2, 1977, at the Watkins Glen Grand Prix Race Course in Watkins Glen, New York. It was the fifteenth race of the 1977 World Championship of F1 Drivers and the 1977 International Cup for F1 Constructors. The event was also referred to as the United States Grand Prix East in order to distinguish it from the United States Grand Prix West held on April 3, 1977, in Long Beach, California. It was covered on American radio by Motor Racing Network.

The 59-lap race was won from pole position by James Hunt, driving a McLaren-Ford. In wet conditions, Hunt held off a late charge from Mario Andretti in the Lotus-Ford to take his second consecutive Watkins Glen victory. Jody Scheckter was third in the Wolf-Ford, while Niki Lauda clinched his second Drivers' Championship by finishing fourth in his Ferrari.

Report
For the first time, the American race was being held before the Canadian Grand Prix, which would follow a week later. Lauda led the championship with 69 points, while Jody Scheckter was second with 42 points. With nine points being awarded for a win, Lauda needed only to score one point in any of the final three races to clinch the title, while Scheckter needed to win them all to have a chance (both would be on 69 points, but Scheckter would have the tiebreaker on wins with 5, compared to Lauda's 3).

From the start of practice on Friday, Hunt's McLaren was dominant, setting a track record of 1:40.863. Brabham teammates Hans-Joachim Stuck and John Watson were a quarter of a second back, followed by Andretti, Ronnie Peterson and the Ferraris of Carlos Reutemann and Lauda. On Saturday morning there was rain just before the end of untimed practice, and so the afternoon session served only as practice for a possible wet race on Sunday, as Friday's times determined the grid.

Sunday began cold but dry, with a crowd over 100,000. Before the warmup, however, it began to drizzle, and by the five-minute signal, it had picked up enough that only John Watson was willing to gamble on starting with slicks. At the flag, everyone got away from the grid and through the first turn without incident, but the spray was so heavy that nothing was visible after the first five cars. Stuck quickly jumped ahead of Hunt, and after one lap, they were followed by Andretti, Reutemann, Peterson, Lauda, Scheckter, Jacques Laffite and Gunnar Nilsson.

Immediately, Scheckter began to take advantage of the others' uncertainty in the conditions and, by lap five had moved from ninth to fourth. Stuck was also going well in the wet, and, despite losing his clutch cable in the first few laps, pulled away from Hunt. Lauda passed his teammate Reutemann for fifth spot when the Argentine spun. On lap 15, with Hunt four seconds behind, Stuck, struggling to make gear changes without a clutch, popped out of gear entering a corner and went straight on. He retired with damage to the monocoque.

Hunt now led Andretti by 10.5 seconds, with Scheckter 14 seconds further back in third. The rain stopped, and  drivers sought the wet sections of a drying track to cool their tires. With 10 laps remaining and the lead at 22 seconds, Hunt backed off in response to a pit signal. Lauda was coasting in fourth, a position sufficient to clinch the Championship. Scheckter had slowed in third to preserve his tires.

With two laps to go, Andretti, who had been closing while Hunt cruised home, was only 6.7 seconds behind. As they began the last lap, the margin had closed to 1.5 seconds, but Hunt increased his lead slightly to win by just over two seconds. The McLaren pit had not informed him how close the Lotus was until the start of the final lap, when Teddy Mayer gave him a frantic wave to pick up the pace.

Lauda thus took his second title, and Ferrari took their third consecutive Constructor's Championship. For Lauda, it was the culmination of a comeback from the life-threatening injuries he had sustained at the Nürburgring in 1976. Almost immediately, the Austrian quit Ferrari, having already announced his intention to move to Brabham for 1978.

Classification

Qualifying

Race

Championship standings after the race

Drivers' Championship standings

Constructors' Championship standings

References

Further reading
 Doug Nye (1978). The United States Grand Prix and grand prize races, 1908-1977. B. T. Batsford. 
 Rob Walker (January, 1978). "18th United States Grand Prix: Wet But Not Wild". Road & Track, 82-86.

United States Grand Prix
United States Grand Prix
United States Grand Prix
United States Grand Prix
United States Grand Prix